Joan Besoli Lluelles (born 17 September 1959) is an Andorran trap shooter who competed in the 1992 Summer Olympics.

Besoli competed in the mixed trap shooting event at the 1992 Summer Olympics and scored 140 hits in the qualification round finishing in joint 29th place so didn't qualify for the semi finals.

References

Shooters at the 1992 Summer Olympics
1959 births
Andorran male sport shooters
Olympic shooters of Andorra
Living people